Michael Link may refer to:
 Michael Georg Link, German politician
 Michael P. Link, American oncologist

See also
 Michael Lynk, Canadian legal academic